Music show may refer to:
 Music Show, an Irish–British racehorse
A concert, of live music
A music radio programme
A music television show